St John the Evangelis, Palmers Green is the parish church of Palmers Green, London Borough of Enfield, North London. It was designed by John Oldrid Scott (brother of George Gilbert Scott Junior) in 1903–9.

References

External links

Palmers Green
Diocese of London
Palmers Green